Hypocacia shimomurai is a species of beetle in the family Cerambycidae. It was described by Holzschuh in 1989. It is known from Taiwan.

References

Mesosini
Beetles described in 1989